Wang Jia is a Chinese film director.

Filmography
Jing tian dong di
The Space Dream (2011)

Awards
He won the Award for Best Director at the 2011 Huabiao Awards. He was nominated for the Hundred Flowers Award for Best Director at the 30th Hundred Flowers Awards for Jing tian dong di.

References

External links

Chinese film directors
Living people
Year of birth missing (living people)